Cloud Dance is the debut album by American sitarist and composer Collin Walcott, released in 1975 on the ECM label. For this record Walcott was joined by the group Gateway consisting of John Abercrombie, Dave Holland and Jack DeJohnette. It was recorded in March 1975, as was the group's debut Gateway. Abercrombie had worked with Walcott the previous year on David Liebman's Drum Ode (ECM 1046), and they collaborated again on Walcott's 1977 album Grazing Dreams.

Reception

The AllMusic review awarded the album 4½ stars.

The authors of the Penguin Guide to Jazz Recordings awarded the album 4 stars, praising its "freshness and originality," and stating: "'Prancing', for just tablas and double bass, is one of the most exciting performances in the ECM catalogue and convincing evidence of Walcott's desire to extend the idiom of the Garrison/Jones rhythm section... the album as a whole can quite reasonably be heard as a suite of related pieces that dance towards their thematic source in the closing title-piece."

Writing for Vinyl Vault, Geoff Anderson commented: "The musicians were all top-flight and leaders in their own right. They came together and mixed the eastern and western sounds to create something like acoustic jazz-fusion with an Indian twist. Abercrombie's ethereal electric guitar, floating above and around Walcott's sitar is particularly effective in creating a dreamy, cloud-like ambience on several tunes. On the cut 'Prancing,' Walcott on tabla and Holland on bass put the 'dance' in 'Cloud Dance' with a particularly energetic and, yes, danceable performance."

In an article at Between Sound and Space, Tyran Grillo called the recording "one of [Walcott's] most powerful albums ever to grace ECM's vinyl... grooves", and wrote: "The telephone wires on the cover are like the strings of some large instrument, with the sky as its sound box. Its clouds don't so much dance as perform, caressing endless waves of voices careening through the ether. The joy of Cloud Dance is that it makes those voices intelligible. Fans of Oregon, of which Walcott was of course an integral part, need look no further for likeminded contemplation."

Track listing
All compositions by Collin Walcott except as indicated.

 "Margueritte" - 8:32
 "Prancing" - 3:24
 "Night Glider" - 6:40
 "Scimitar" (John Abercrombie, Walcott)  - 2:46
 "Vadana" - 7:00
 "Eastern Song" - 2:34
 "Padma" (Abercrombie, Walcott) - 2:47
 "Cloud Dance" - 5:47

Personnel
Collin Walcott — sitar, tabla
John Abercrombie — guitar
Dave Holland — bass
Jack DeJohnette — drums

References

ECM Records albums
Collin Walcott albums
1976 debut albums
Albums produced by Manfred Eicher